Strange Portrait is a film set in Hong Kong. It was directed by Jeffrey Stone and starred Jeffrey Hunter, Barbara Lee, Mai Tai Sing and Tina Hutchence. Its associate producer was Terry Bourke.  In 1966 Stone and his wife went searching for a distributor, hoping to enter it into the Asian Film Festival. The film never saw a release and there is some mystery about what happened.

Sources differ as to what happened to the film. One report is that it was destroyed in a warehouse fire. Terry Bourke, the film's producer had been searching for years to find a print of the film. This would possibly indicate that be believed a print had been made from the negative. Director Jeffrey Stone said the film was suppressed by the film studio at the behest of the Hong Kong government because of a scene featuring partial nudity. It is considered to be a lost film.

Synopsis
The film has been described as a spooky thriller. Christina Stone played a ballet dancer and the lead role was played by Jeffrey Hunter. Hunter played the role of Mark, an expat American and petty thief in Hong Kong who lives with his Chinese girlfriend played by Barbara Lee. One day while watching a soccer game, a mansion catches his eye and he breaks into it. Whilst inside, he notices a portrait there that looks just like him. The only person living in the mansion is a wealthy but mad woman played by Mai Tai Sing. He finds out that the painting that looks like him is actually that of her husband who deserted her years before. He also discovers that she has an abundance of jewelry and decided to woo her and pretend that he is her departed husband. While gaining access to the woman's treasure he makes a startling and macabre discovery and thus has a tragic end.

Cast and crew
Jason Evers was the original choice for the lead role. He had to vacate the role in favor of a television pilot, Three for Danger, thus the role was filled by Jeffrey Hunter even though his agent wasn't keen on the idea.

It was reported in the Milwaukee Sentinel that Jeffrey Hunter was to wed Mai Tai Sing, a business woman who was a cast member. It would take place in Hong Kong where the film was being shot. Mai Tai Sing had acted in the television series Hong Kong.
 
Patricia Hutchence,  the makeup artist in this film, is the mother of INXS frontman Michael Hutchence. Her daughter Tina Hutchence, who had a role in the film, is Hutchence's half-sister.

Barbara Lee, better known by her stage name Barbara Yu Ling, was the first Singaporean Chinese actress to achieve success in Europe. According to director Jeffrey Stone's memoirs, Strange Portrait was suppressed by the Hong Kong censors because of a scene Lee shared with Jeffrey Hunter in which her breasts were partially visible.

Christina Stone who played the part of a ballet dancer, was the wife of Jeffrey Stone. She was once married to cinema magnate Dato Loke Wan Tho.

Actors
 Jeffrey Hunter ... Mark
 Tina Hutchence
 Mai Tai Sing
 Barbara Lee
 Christina Stone
 John Wallace

Crew
 Jeffrey Stone – director & writer
 Terry Bourke – associate producer
 Paul Lewis – music
 Peter R. Hunt – editor
 Patricia Hutchence – makeup artist 
 Peter MacGregor-Scott – assistant director

Production company
 East-West Motion Picture Co.

References

External links
 
 Patricia Hutchence and Jeffrey Hunter on set
 Strange Portrait at Jeffrey Hunter site

1966 films
Singaporean crime films
1960s lost films
Unreleased films
1960s English-language films